USS Chauvenet (AGS-11/YMS-195) was a  built for the United States Navy during World War II. She was constructed as USS YMS-195 at the Hiltebrant Dry Dock Company of Kingston, New York, and was laid down on 3 April 1942, launched on 10 August 1942, and commissioned on 20 March 1943.

On 20 March 1945, YMS-195 was reclassified as a survey ship and redesignated USS Chauvenet (AGS-11). After decommissioning, Chauvenet was sold to a British firm in 1947 and renamed Zipper. She was lost off South America in a storm in 1963.

References 
 
 

YMS-1-class minesweepers of the United States Navy
Ships built in Kingston, New York
1942 ships
World War II minesweepers of the United States
Survey ships of the United States Navy
World War II auxiliary ships of the United States